Hindurao Nilkanthrao Naik Nimbalkar (born 15 August 1948 in Shendewadi, Satara Maharashtra) was an Indian politician and member of the Shiv Sena. Naik Nimbalkar was a member of the 11th Lok Sabha from the Satara constituency in Maharashtra.

References 

People from Satara district
Shiv Sena politicians
India MPs 1996–1997
Lok Sabha members from Maharashtra
Living people
21st-century Indian politicians
Maharashtra politicians
1948 births